Wallis Day (born 20 September 1994) is an English actress and former model. She is known for playing Holly Cunningham in the soap opera Hollyoaks, Nyssa-Vex in the TV series Krypton, and Kate Kane in the second season of the TV series Batwoman.

Early life 
Wallis Day was born on 20 September 1994 in London, England and raised in Ilford. Her father was educated in the University of Oxford, and her mother at the University of Cambridge. Day has stated that she came from "a very normal family with very normal jobs" as none of her family had ties to the entertainment industry. When five years old, she became passionate about acting after being taken to see ballets by her father, and joined Stagecoach Theatre Arts at the same age. During her formative years, Day and her family frequently moved house; in 12 years, Day studied in 11 different schools. Day attended the Sylvia Young Theatre School, and later the Arts Educational Schools (ArtsEd).

Career 
Day signed on to the modelling agency Models 1 at the age of 13, and was the youngest in the agency for three years. She has stated that she started modelling "to save up to go to drama school". During her tenure as a model, Day modelled for Garnier, Superdry and Nike among others. At 16, she quit modelling to pursue a career in acting. One of her earliest screen appearances was in a commercial for Nintendo 3DS, where she is seen playing Super Mario 3D Land. When she was 19, she landed her first film role as Lucy in Between Two Worlds in 2016. Day's first television role was Holly Cunningham in the British soap opera Hollyoaks from 2012 to 2013.

In 2014, Day appeared in a YouTube prank video where she masquerades as the girlfriend of Caspar Lee, and flirts with his roommate Joe Sugg. The video gained over 23 million views. In the same year, she appeared in the music videos for Lea Michele's "On My Way", Arctic Monkeys' "Arabella" and 5 Seconds of Summer's "She Looks So Perfect", and in the seventh episode of the fourth series of Sky One's Trollied. In 2015, Day appeared as Angelica in the television film Casanova, and played Olalla Jekyll/Hyde in the ITV series Jekyll and Hyde. After Jekyll and Hyde, she took a hiatus to study at ArtsEd.

In 2016, Day appeared in the Instagram original series Shield 5 as Amy Williams, and joined The Royals in the recurring role of Angie which she played till 2018. In 2017, she appeared as Cressida Deveraux in the TNT series Will. From 2018 to 2019, Day portrayed the series regular role of Nyssa-Vex, Superman's grandmother, in the Syfy series Krypton. She appeared as Agent Shin in the science fiction film Infinite, released in 2021.

In March 2021, Day was cast to recur in the second season of the CW series Batwoman to take over the role of Kate Kane from Ruby Rose. She debuted in the episode "Initiate Self-Destruct", where the character's facial change is explained. Day also portrayed Circe Sionis. In February 2022, she joined the second season of Netflix's Sex/Life in a recurring role as Gigi, and in August, joined Red Sonja in the role of the title character's half-sister Annisia.

Personal life 
Day dislikes playing stock characters such as "the girlfriend of the main character or the girl next door"; she has cited her preference for roles requiring more action, including femmes fatales. An aspiring writer, she wrote a psychological thriller novel in the mid-2010s and hopes to convert it into a screenplay. Day is trained in Mixed martial arts, boxing and Muay Thai. She is also a trained swimmer, and began preparing to participate in the 2012 Summer Olympics, but decided to leave swimming to focus on her acting career. Day declared herself vegan in 2017. She has chosen not to comment on her sexuality, stating in 2017, "Being straight, bisexual or gay is NOT a choice. All I'll say on that matter."

Filmography

Television

Film

Music videos

References

External links 
 

1994 births
21st-century English actresses
English female mixed martial artists
English female models
English Muay Thai practitioners
Living people
Models from London